The Shfaram synagogue is an ancient synagogue located in the Israeli-Arab city of Shfaram, Northern Israel.

The synagogue was built in the 17th century, atop the ruins of an ancient synagogue that had been built on a site where, according to tradition, the Sanhedrin had once sat. The synagogue fell into ruin, but during   the mid-18th century, Bedouin chieftain Zahir al-Umar gave permission to the Jews to return and renovate the synagogue there. The synagogue was renovated by Rabbi Chaim Abulafia and his students.

Shfaram was noted in 1845 by Rabbi Joseph Schwarz in his book Descriptive Geography and Brief Historical Sketch of Palestine as having "about thirty Jewish families who have an old synagogue". Jews lived in Shfaram until the 1970s when the community disbanded. Subsequently, the building fell into disrepair and was only recently renovated. Although being abandoned, the keys to the former house of worship are held by a local Muslim and the synagogue is treated with respect by the local Arabs.

In November 2006 the building was rededicated after works to renovate the synagogue were carried out voluntarily by a group of newly qualified police officers. At the ceremony, Shfaram mayor Ursan Yassin retold how that during the October riots he had been forced to physically protect the location and had told local youngsters who wanted to burn it down that they could set him alight, but he would not allow them to harm the synagogue. There were however reports of damage to religious artifacts in the ancient synagogue on October 9, 2000.

References

18th-century synagogues
Ancient synagogues in the Land of Israel
Buildings and structures in Northern District (Israel)
Synagogues in the Ottoman Empire